O.A.R. (short for Of A Revolution) is an American rock band, founded in 1996 in Rockville, Maryland. The band consists of lead vocalist/guitarist Marc Roberge, drummer Chris Culos, guitarist Richard On, bassist Benj Gershman, saxophonist/guitarist Jerry DePizzo, and touring members, trumpet player Jon Lampley and keyboardist Mikel Paris. Together, the band has released ten studio albums. The band is well known for their live shows and extensive summer touring, and have released six live records, with the latest release, Live From Merriweather, in November 2019. Four of the band members grew up in Rockville, Maryland and attended Thomas Sprigg Wootton High School. After graduating, they went on to study at Ohio State University. There they met the fifth member, saxophonist/guitarist Jerry DePizzo from Youngstown, Ohio.

Their newest album, "The Arcade", was released on July 15th, 2022. The album was produced by Jantz Spalding.

History

Formation and early years (1996–2004)
After earlier iterations performing together as far back as middle school, O.A.R. was formed in 1996 by lead vocalist Marc Roberge and drummer Chris Culos, inspired in part by Roberge's older brother, who plays drums for the band Foxtrot Zulu. They later recruited Richard On and Benj Gershman. In 1996 they recorded their debut album, The Wanderer, at Gizmo Recording Company in Silver Spring, Maryland with engineer/producer Gantt Kushner. Many songs from the album, including "Black Rock" and "That Was A Crazy Game of Poker", became staples of their live shows and are still played at most concerts today.

Three of the four band members attended one semester at Alexander Muss High School in Israel, graduated from Wootton High School in Rockville, Maryland, then moved to Columbus, Ohio to attend Ohio State University. While at OSU, they met Jerry DePizzo, from Youngstown, Ohio. He joined the band as the saxophonist, completing the current lineup. In 1999, they returned to Gizmo Recording to record their second album, Soul's Aflame.

Unlike other similar bands, O.A.R. did not use much formal advertising/marketing plans to obtain an audience, instead choosing to rely on word-of-mouth and touring alone. Their third album Risen debuted at No.11 on the Billboard top internet sales chart. They received offers from various major labels, but ultimately chose to sign with Lava Records in 2002.  The following year, their fourth album In Between Now and Then debuted at No. 156 on the Billboard 200 chart.

Mainstream success (2005–present)
In 2005, O.A.R. released their fifth album, Stories of a Stranger, which debuted at No. 40 on the Billboard 200. It produced the singles "Love and Memories", "Heard the World", and "Lay Down." "Love and Memories" was the band's first single to chart and receive significant radio airplay, peaking at 98 in the Pop 100, at 30 in Modern Rock Tracks, and at 18 in Adult Top 40. The music videos for "Love and Memories" and "Lay Down" received airplay on VH1 and MTV. The video for "Lay Down" received a "Woodie" award from MTV for streaming video.

On January 14, 2006, O.A.R. reached a new peak of popularity by drawing roughly 18,000 fans and selling out New York City's Madison Square Garden, which earned them a review in The New York Times. On October 5, 2006, a press release declared that O.A.R. had officially sold in excess of 1.2 million albums over their career. The band attributes much of its popularity to the recording and subsequent trading and downloading of their live shows.

On July 15, 2008, O.A.R. released their sixth studio album, All Sides. The first radio single for All Sides, "Shattered (Turn the Car Around)", was released on June 13, despite the band initially having hesitations about including the song on the album. It surpassed "Love And Memories", peaking at 2 in Adult Top 40. In December 2008, VH1 named the music video for "Shattered" as number 18 on their Top 40 Videos of 2008.

In 2010, O.A.R. returned to the studio to record their seventh studio album, King. The band introduced several of their new songs during the 2010 tour, including: "Over and Over", "Fire", "Dangerous Connection", and "Gotta Live." King was released on Wind-up Records on August 2, 2011 and debuted at number 12 on the Billboard 200, the highest-charting debut for the band so far. The album's first single, "Heaven", was released on June 7, 2011. On May 8, 2012, O.A.R. released a new single as part of a collaboration with Duracell in support of Team USA in the 2012 London Summer Olympics. The song is called "Champions", and features rapper B.o.B, who contributed the vocals in the verses.

On November 19, 2012, O.A.R. released a live CD/DVD entitled Live on Red Rocks, which consists of footage and music from their performance at Red Rocks Amphitheatre on their 2012 summer tour.

In an interview with Billboard magazine posted on January 16, 2014, Jerry Depizzo revealed that their eighth studio album would be released in May 2014, and that the lead single would be "Peace"—a new song they played live many times on their 2013 summer tour. On March 21, 2014, the band announced via various social media sites that the new album, titled The Rockville LP would be released on June 10, 2014.

The Rockville LP debuted at number 13 on Billboards top 200, #1 independent albums, #6 top current rock albums, and #7 current digital albums. 

In May 2016, the band announced the release of a career spanning compilation to coincide with their 20th anniversary. Entitled XX, the album was released on August 5, 2016 bundled with a disc of live performances and two new songs "Follow Me, Follow You" and "I Go Through". The band embarked on a two-month tour of North America.

In 2018, O.A.R. returned to the studio to record their ninth studio album, The Mighty. The first single from the album is "Miss You All the Time", released on October 12, 2018. The Mighty was presented and released to the public on March 29, 2019.

O.A.R. released a new single “Alive” on November 18, 2021 to tease out a forthcoming tour and album in 2022. The album, titled The Arcade, was their tenth album. It was released on July 15, 2022.

 Charitable endeavors and other appearances 
The band's Heard The World foundation was founded to support youth, education and sustainable programs both in the U.S. and abroad.

On December 14, 2012, O.A.R. performed with the Baltimore Symphony Orchestra at the Music Center at Strathmore.  The concert benefited the Heard the World Foundation.

In December 2009, Jerry DePizzo headlined a charity fundraiser for Music Loves Ohio in Columbus at The Basement.

The band worked with SAIC, a US defense contractor, to raise money for the Paralyzed Veterans of America, a service organization focused on assisting veterans with spinal cord injuries and diseases, through digital downloads of the band's song "Light Switch Sky." Proceeds from downloads of the song through July 22, 2010 supported paralyzed veterans. The song was co-written by O.A.R. and their fans through a competition on Twitter.

On October 4, 2012, the band headlined a "But for Ohio State: Rock the Oval" concert at Ohio State University to help raise money for the school that  the band's members attended.

O.A.R. and Phillip Phillips' 2014 Summer Tour benefited Habitat for Humanity.

O.A.R. performed live from Times Square on December 31, 2014 at Dick Clark's Rockin' New Years Eve.

O.A.R. performed at the opening and closing ceremonies of the 2015 Special Olympics World Summer Games.

Marc Roberge and Jon Lampley performed the Star Spangled Banner in Columbus, Ohio before an NHL game between the Columbus Blue Jackets and the Boston Bruins on March 5, 2022. The game was notable for holding a ceremony retiring the first jersey number in Blue Jackets history; Rick Nash's number 61.

MembersCurrent members Marc Roberge – lead vocals, rhythm guitar (1996–present)
 Richard On – lead guitar, backing vocals (1996–present)
 Benj Gershman – bass (1996–present)
 Chris Culos – drums (1996–present)
 Jerry DePizzo – saxophone, guitar, backing vocals (2000–present)Current touring members Mikel Paris – keyboards, percussion, backing vocals (2006–present)
 Jon Lampley – trumpet, sousaphone, backing vocals (2011–present)Former touring members Evan Oberla – trombone, backing vocals (2011–2014)Timeline'''

Discography

 The Wanderer (1997)
 Soul's Aflame (1999)
 Risen (2001)
 In Between Now and Then (2003)
 Stories of a Stranger (2005)
 All Sides (2008)
 King (2011)
 The Rockville LP (2014)
 The Mighty (2019)
 The Arcade'' (2022)

Notes

External links

[ Billboard.com Band Profile]
oarsa.org setlist archive, lyrics, and fan site

Jam bands
Ohio State University alumni
Musical groups established in 1996
Atlantic Records artists
Alternative rock groups from Maryland
Indie rock musical groups from Maryland
Musicians from Rockville, Maryland